{{Infobox legislature
 | name               = Eighth Punjab Legislative Assembly 
 | native_name        = 
 | native_name_lang   = 
 | transcription_name = 
 | legislature        = Punjab Legislative Assembly
 | coa_pic            = 
 | coa_res            = 250px
 | coa_alt            = 
 | house_type         = Unicameral
 | term_length        = 1980-1985
 | body               = 
 | houses             = 
 | foundation = 23 June 1980
 | disbanded = 26 June 1985
 | suspension = 6 October 1983
 | preceded_by = Seventh Punjab Legislative Assembly
 | succeeded_by = Ninth Punjab Legislative Assembly
 | leader1_type       = Speaker 
 | leader1            = Brij Bhushan Mehra
 | party1    = 
 | leader2   = 
 | leader3_type       = Deputy Speaker
 | leader3           = Guizar Singh
 | leader4            = 
 | leader5_type       = Leader of House(Chief Minister)
| leader5             =Darbara Singh 
| leader6             =
 | leader7_type       = Leader of the Opposition
 | leader7            = Parkash Singh Badal 
 | leader8            = 
 | committees1        = 
 | committees2        = 
 | joint_committees   = 
 | voting_system1     = first-past-the-post
 | voting_system2     = 
 | last_election1     = 1980
 | next_election1     = 1985
 | redistricting = 
 | session_room       = 
 | session_res        = 
 | session_alt        = 
 | meeting_place      = 
 | members            = 117
 | structure1    = 
 | structure1_res = 
 | political_groups1  = Government (63)
  INC (63)Opposition (54)  SAD (37)
  CPI (9)
  CPIM (5)
  BJS (1)
  IND (2)
}} 
The 1980 Punjab Legislative Assembly election''' was the eighth Vidhan Sabha (Legislative Assembly) election of the state. Indian National Congress emerged as the victorious with 63 seats in the 117-seat legislature in the election. The Shiromani Akali Dal became the official opposition, holding 37 seats. On 6 October 1983, Assembly was placed under suspension and president rule was imposed and then dissolved on 26 June 1985.

Background

Insurgency

Suspension of Assembly

Notes

References

8th
 
1980 establishments in Punjab, India